Afsal is an Indian film singer in Malayalam cinema. His first film song was "Kannilambum Villum" for the movie Valyettan in 2000. He has sung more than 250 movie songs. His popular songs include 
"Kai thudi thalam", "En Karalil Raakshasi","kaithudi Thalam", "Ishtamalleda Enikkishtamalleda", "Shaaba Shaaba",Meharuba,chirimanimulle, "Penne en penne,manassilayiram,
veluveluthorupennu and jillam jillala

Discography
Following is a partial discography:

Television Shows as Judge
Mylanchy (Asianet)
Pathinalam Raavu ( Media One)
Flowers Top Singer (Flowers TV)
Paadam Namukku Paadam (Mazhavil Manorama)

References

External links

Malayalam playback singers
Indian male playback singers
Film musicians from Kerala
Singers from Kochi
21st-century Indian singers
21st-century Indian male singers
1973 births
Living people